The 2018 All Japan High School Women's Soccer Tournament was the 27th edition of the competition. It has held in Kobe through January 3 — 13, 2019, and it was won for the first time by Yokohama's Seisa Kokusai. In the final they defeated five times-champion Tokiwagi Gakuen, which had knocked out defending champion Fujieda Junshin on penalties in the first round.

Qualified teams

Results

Quarterfinals

Semifinals

Final

References

All Japan High School Women's Soccer Tournament